The sixteenth season of South African Idols premiered on 2 August 2020, 17:30 SAST and concluded on 13 December 2020 on the Mzansi Magic television network. The season was won by Zama Khumalo and the runner-up was Mr Music.

Finalists

Weekly Song Choice and Result

Top 16

Boys (20 September)

Girls (27 September)

Top 10 (11 October)

Top 9 (18 October)

Top 8 (25 October)

Top 7: Showstoppers (1 November)

Top 6 (8 November)

Top 5: Theatre Week (15 November)

Top 4 (22 November)

Top 3 (29 November)

Top 2 (6 December) 

 Before his elimination Brandon performed his single Uhambe.

Elimination Chart 
Colour key

References

Idols South Africa
2020 South African television seasons